Cecil Gordon (June 21, 1941 – September 19, 2012) was an American stock car racing driver. A competitor in the NASCAR Winston Cup Series between 1968 and 1985, he competed in 449 events without winning a race.

NASCAR

Career as driver
Gordon drove in the NASCAR Grand National and Winston Cup Series for 17 years and drove in a total of 449 races. He never won and never got a pole, he did not even finish a race on the lead lap, but got 29 top fives and 111 top tens. He finished third in points in 1971 and 1973. He completed 112,908 laps and only led 23 of them. By the end of his career, he had earned $940,000. His average finish for his entire career was 17.3. Racing Champions released a replica of 1969 Mercury Cyclone in 1992 and later in 1998 in honor of NASCAR's 50th anniversary.

Career as owner
He started racing in Henley Gray and Bill Seifert cars. He generally raced in his own car beginning in 1970. He had a few other racers make an occasional start for him.  He raced GM products (mostly Chevrolet vehicles) until the end of 1982 when he crashed out his Buick Regal.  He purchased a Chrysler Imperial at the beginning of 1983 from the defunct Negre Bros. Racing team and managed to qualify for eight races during that season, though he only finished five of them.  His best finish was 15th that year in the Imperial.  He also had Jim VanDiver drive the car in two races.  At the end of that year he sold the Imperial to Buddy Arrington. Gordon returned for one more race in 1985 for the family-owned team of Greg Sacks.

Career as crewman
Following the end of his career as a driver and owner, Gordon worked for other racing teams as a crewman, first for Richard Childress Racing, and then later for Travis Carter Enterprises.

Personal life 
Gordon is not related to four-time NASCAR champion Jeff Gordon, yet, coincidentally, they both drove the 24 car.

Gordon, who was married with four children, Charlene (who died in 2006), Douglas, Stefanie and Jonathon. Gordon died on September 19, 2012 in Lexington, North Carolina.

Motorsports career results

NASCAR
(key) (Bold – Pole position awarded by qualifying time. Italics – Pole position earned by points standings or practice time. * – Most laps led.)

Grand National Series

Winston Cup Series

Daytona 500

References

External links
 

1941 births
2012 deaths
People from Henderson County, North Carolina
Racing drivers from North Carolina
NASCAR drivers
NASCAR team owners